Wisecracks is a Canadian documentary film, directed by Gail Singer and released in 1991. The film profiles a number of women who were active in comedy in the late 1980s and early 1990s, including Joy Behar, Phyllis Diller, Ellen DeGeneres, Whoopi Goldberg, Geri Jewell, Paula Poundstone, Sandra Shamas and Jenny Jones.

The film premiered at the 1991 Festival of Festivals. Singer's comedy film True Confections was also screened at the same festival, making her the first filmmaker in the festival's history to have both a documentary and a narrative fiction film screened at the festival in the same year.

The film subsequently received a Genie Award nomination for Best Feature Length Documentary at the 13th Genie Awards in 1992.

References

External links
 

1991 films
1991 documentary films
Canadian documentary films
1990s English-language films
Documentary films about comedy and comedians
Documentary films about women
1990s Canadian films